The 2020–21 season was FC Noah's 3rd season in Armenian Premier League, and second since they changed their name from Artsakh FC. Noah finished the season in 2nd position, reached the semi-final of the Armenian Cup, won the Armenian Supercup and were knocked out of the UEFA Europa League at the first qualifying round by Kairat.

Season events
On 24 July, Noah extended their contracts with Alan Tatayev, Pavel Deobald and Valerio Vimercati.

On 30 July, Noah announced the signing of goalkeeper Samvel Hunanyan from Dilijan.

On 1 August, Noah announced the signing of Artem Simonyan from Pyunik, and the departure of Vitali Zaprudskikh, Hovhannes Nazaryan, Artem Delinyan, Sergey Dmitriev and Vigen Avetisyan.

On 3 August, Noah announced the signing of Vardan Shakhbazyan from Shirak.

On 29 September, the season was suspended indefinitely due to the escalating 2020 Nagorno-Karabakh conflict. On 13 October, the FFA announced that the season would resume on 17 October.

On 17 October, Noah's match against Lori was postponed due to 7 positive COVID-19 cases within their team. 5 Days later, 22 October, their match against Pyunik was also postponed as a result of the positive COVID-19 cases.

On 5 November, Dmitri Gunko was appointed as the clubs new Head Coach.

On 28 January 2021, Sheriff Tiraspol announced that Vadim Paireli had left their club to sign for Noah.

On 29 January, Noah announced the signings of Dobrivoje Velemir, Gegham Harutyunyan, Pavel Kireyenko and Andrei Titov.

On 31 January, Noah announced the signing of Ashot Adamyan.

On 2 February, Noah announced the signing of Yaroslav Matviyenko from Yenisey Krasnoyarsk, with Jefferson Oliveira joining the following day from Persik Kediri.

On 16 February, Noah announced the signing of Raymond Gyasi from Kazma.

On 27 February, Noah announced the signing of Petros Avetisyan on a free transfer after he'd left Tobol.

Squad

Out on loan

Transfers

In

Loans in

Loans out

Released

Friendlies

Competitions

Supercup

Premier League

Results summary

Results by round

Results

Table

Armenian Cup

UEFA Europa League

Qualifying rounds

Statistics

Appearances and goals

|-
|colspan="16"|Players away on loan:

|-
|colspan="16"|Players who left Noah during the season:

|}

Goal scorers

Clean sheets

Disciplinary record

References

FC Noah seasons
Noah